Mercurio the 4-D Man (abbreviation of four dimensional - a feature of Mercurio's home world) is a fictional character appearing in American comic books published by Marvel Comics.

Publication history

Mercurio first  appears in Thor #208 (Feb. 1973) and was created by Gerry Conway and John Buscema.

Later, he comes back in issue #214, where he faces Thor inside the Black Nebula.

Fictional character biography
Mercurio is a native of the planet Gramos, a world threatened with extinction when a gravitational distortion blocks out all sunlight. In a bid to save Gramos, Mercurio was chosen as a government psycho-explorer to project his consciousness across the galaxy to Earth, where he takes control of a wealthy landlord and uses his resources to build a device to siphon off Earth's electro-magnetic field. Mercurio also detects strange energies coming from the offices of Dr. Donald Blake, the alter-ego of the Thunder God Thor. Witnessing a transformation from Blake to Thor, Mercurio siphons off some of the magical energy in an attempt to transport his body across space to Earth. The process is only partially successful as the right side of Mercurio's body is turned red and his normal fire-generating ability is changed to ice (on the left side only). Mercurio then battles Thor and the Warriors Three in an attempt to complete his transformation, but is quickly defeated and encased in molten iron by Thor.

Several weeks after returning to Gramos, Mercurio leads an army to find the God Jewel, a gem containing enough energy to sustain Gramos forever. The God Jewel, however, proves to be sentient and evolves into a humanoid form called Xorr, and is capable of sucking the life energy from any source. Coincidentally, Thor and several allies are also seeking the God Jewel as it has imprisoned two Asgardian goddesses, Sif and Karnilla. With Thor's help Xorr is defeated, and Mercurio retrieves several fragments of the God Jewel for use on Gramos.

Although Gramos is saved, Mercurio develops a desire to conquer, and attempts to trick Captain Marvel into visiting Gramos and building the Omni-Wave Projector - a device capable of emitting energies on a galaxy-wide scale. Captain Marvel's cosmic awareness, however, warns him of the trap and after defeating Mercurio he returns to Earth.

Mercurio was later seen as a prisoner on the laboratory-world of the Stranger. With the other captives, Mercurio escaped and attacked the Stranger, only to be defeated by the Whizzer of the Squadron Supreme.

Mercurio was later summoned by Zarrko to battle the second Thor, Beta Ray Bill and Dargo Ktor but was defeated.

Some time later, Mercurio was among the extraterrestrial criminals exiled to Earth when it was transformed into a maximum security prison planet. In an attempt to escape, he again donned his Karl Sarron alias and lured Captain America to the Statue Of Liberty, with the goal of using the Captain's shield to power up a machine to teleport off the planet. Sensing a trap, and hoping the device could help remove all the aliens from Earth, Captain America played along until he had an opportunity to foil Mercurio's plans. During the battle, Cap regained his shield, causing the machine to overload. Mercurio began to overload as well, and though Captain America implored him to release the energies by using his powers, Mercurio neglected to do so, causing his apparent demise in an explosion.

Years later, a seemingly powerless Mercurio begins assembling an army with the intention of using it to establish a galaxy-spanning Gramosian empire. Mercurio's plans face opposition in the form of the Space Knight Agent Venom, who foils the Gramosian's attempts to steal resources from the home planets of the P'qui and the Wugin, and to acquire chemical weapons derived from the blood of kidnapped Vvexians.

Mercurio forces a Ruu'lto named Pik Rollo, whose child he is holding hostage, to try and assassinate Agent Venom, but Rollo instead betrays Mercurio, and joins forces with Venom. When the two lay siege to Mercurio's headquarters, he incapacitates and imprisons them, and separates the Venom symbiote from Flash Thompson. Sensing the symbiote's suppressed bloodlust, Mercurio attempts to convince it to join him, but it instead frees and returns to Thompson. The reformed Agent Venom and his allies proceed to dismantle Mercurio's forces, but Mercurio himself escapes, and swears vengeance on both the symbiote and Thompson.

A bout of temporary insanity that the Venom symbiote subsequently experiences is eventually discerned to have been caused by its brief fusion with Mercurio, whose evil had undone the mental "cleansing" that the creature had earlier undergone.

Powers and abilities
As a native of the planet Gramos, Mercurio possesses an alien metabolism granting him the ability to generate intense heat, usually in the form of a fireball or wall of flame. As a result of his "accident" and transformation into a half-negative being, Mercurio can now emit intense cold from the left side of his body. He is also able to use both abilities simultaneously. Mercurio also possesses enhanced strength and durability as well as flight, although it is not known whether the latter is an innate ability or is achieved via technological means. Mercurio's mind is capable of interplanetary teleportation. Gramosians are naturally blue-black, suggesting that the "negative" side of his body is the red side.

References

External links
 Mercurio at Marvel.com
 

Comics characters introduced in 1973
Marvel Comics aliens
Marvel Comics characters with superhuman strength
Marvel Comics extraterrestrial supervillains
Marvel Comics supervillains